Deltocolpodes is a genus of beetles in the family Carabidae, containing the following species:

 Deltocolpodes brendelli Morvan, 1992
 Deltocolpodes championi Morvan, 1992
 Deltocolpodes duluchus Morvan, 1992
 Deltocolpodes heinigeri Morvan, 1992
 Deltocolpodes jalepensis Morvan, 1992
 Deltocolpodes kirschenhoferi Morvan, 1992
 Deltocolpodes nepalensis Morvan, 1992
 Deltocolpodes perreaui Deuve, 1985
 Deltocolpodes rectangulus Morvan, 1992
 Deltocolpodes rolex Morvan, 1992
 Deltocolpodes salpensis Deuve, 1985
 Deltocolpodes sikkimensis Morvan, 1992

References

Platyninae